Kaneto (written: 金刃, 金戸 or 兼人) is both a Japanese surname and a masculine Japanese given name. Notable people with the name include:

Surname:
 (born 1984), Japanese baseball player
 (born 1988), Japanese swimmer
 (born 1940), Japanese diver

Given name:
 (1912–2012), Japanese film director
 (1954–2000), Japanese voice actor

Japanese-language surnames
Japanese masculine given names